Marc Marino (born 30 April 1996) is an Australian professional footballer who plays a centre forward for National Premier Leagues club Campbelltown City.

Career

Born in Adelaide, Marino first came to national prominence when he was signed up for the Australian Institute of Sport to play in the National Youth League for the 2012–13 season. Recording six goals in his first season and eight in his second, his first-year performances were good enough to earn him an invitation to train with Adelaide United for two weeks in August 2013. A contract was not forthcoming, however, and after returning to AIS for his second season, he was instead signed up by Melbourne City on 18 August 2014.

Marino did not have to wait long for his senior debut, being brought on in the first league game of the season, a match against Sydney FC on 11 October 2014, replacing Mate Dugandzic in the 73rd minute. He scored in his next game against the Brisbane Roar.

Marc Marino sustained a serious knee injury on 4 September 2015 in a 5-0 pre-season win over North Geelong Warriors FC, a game in which he scored the opening goal. Marino was released by Melbourne City on 28 April 2016.

On 23 May 2016, Marino signed with hometown club Adelaide United. At the end of Adelaide's 2016–17 season, Marino rejoined Campbelltown City following the expiry of his contract, but nonetheless returned to Adelaide United for pre-season training under new coach Marco Kurz.

Career statistics

References

External links 
 

1996 births
Living people
Australian soccer players
Australia under-20 international soccer players
Australian Institute of Sport soccer players
Soccer players from Adelaide
Campbelltown City SC players
Melbourne City FC players
Adelaide United FC players
A-League Men players
National Premier Leagues players
Association football forwards